= Haikou Fucheng Church =

Church in Haikou, China

Haikou Fucheng Church (Chinese: 海口府城堂; pinyin: Hǎikǒu Fǔchéngtáng), full name Haikou City Christian Fucheng Church, abbreviation Fucheng Church, is one of the oldest and largest Protestant churches on Hainan Island, China. The church was founded in 1912 and has changed its location four times in its history of over 100 years. The new church is located in Fucheng Town, Qiongshan District, Haikou City, the provincial capital of Hainan, with a construction area of more than 2,300 square meters.

== History ==
In 1881, Hong Kong Pastor Ji Wentian, a missionary of the Presbyterian Church in America, rented a local ancestral hall in Haikou Fucheng and established Hainan's first preaching station.

In 1912, Pastor John Zhang, the successor of Pastor Ji, built a 500-square-meter church in Beiguan Village, Fucheng, and named it "Fucheng Church". Later, a pastor house, a bible building, a girls' middle school, a boys' middle school, etc. were built, making Fucheng Church the largest church on the entire Hainan Island.

In 1950, Fucheng Church was taken over by the government. During the Cultural Revolution, as other churches in China, Fucheng Church was forced to close and religious activities ceased.

In 1981, when the religious freedom policy was reapplied in mainland Chian, open gatherings and worship services of Fucheng Church were held at the home of a church elder. Later, the government allocated a land of more than 300 square meters near Wenzhuang Road for them to build a church.

In 2005, the Haikou Municipal Government allocated 6,500 square meters of land in another place for the church to set up new buildings. But there were no roads to access the land, and the church had no money. So the believers kept praying in the morning, asking God to open a way, and with support from different sources, the difficulties were finally solved.

In 2012, the new Fucheng Church was completed. The cerebration of new church dedication and commemoration of 100th anniversary were held on September 18. The church is located on the south side of Fengxiang Road, Fucheng Town, Qiongshan District, Haikou City.

== Architecture ==
Fucheng Church is one of the largest churches on Hainan Island. It covers an area of 6,500 square meters, with a construction area of more than 2,300 square meters, and can accommodate more than 2,000 people to attend worship at the same time.

The main auditorium is two-story, with an ochre-yellow Gothic porch, and the hall inside is spacious and bright; the secondary auditorium is four-story. The architecture styles combine both Western and Hainan local features.
